James Traynor (born 27 September 1953) is a Scottish former sports journalist and former Director of Communications at Rangers F.C. 
Prior to joining the Glasgow club, Traynor was employed by the Scottish newspaper the Daily Record. He was also presenter of BBC Radio Scotland's football-based phone-in show Your Call.

Traynor was also a pundit on the Superscoreboard show on Radio Clyde for the 2000–2001 season. He also appeared on Scotsport during that season.

In December 2012 he wrote his final article for the Daily Record. Following rumours about a role at Rangers, he took up the position of Director of Communications on 8 December 2012 and resigned on 1 November 2013.

Personal life 
According to the article Traynor published entitled 'Secret Fear that Drives Me to Win 10 in a Row' for the Daily Record, the journalist interviewed the then Rangers F.C. chairman Sir David Murray and took particular fondness for the 'most succulent lamb' that Murray was having, apparently celebrating the food choices of his host. The phrase 'succulent lamb' has been used by rival fans in Scotland ever since in reference to some journalists writing flattering and uncritical articles about Rangers F.C. in exchange for benefits and priority access to Rangers' news.

References

1953 births
Living people
Rangers F.C. non-playing staff
Place of birth missing (living people)
BBC sports presenters and reporters
Scottish sportswriters